Turkmenistan participated at the 2006 Asian Games, held in Doha, Qatar from December 1 to December 15, 2006. Turkmenistan ranked 33rd along with Laos with a lone silver medal in this edition of the Asiad.

Medalist

References

Nations at the 2006 Asian Games
2006